= Oshkosh Steam Wagon =

The Oshkosh Steam Wagon, also called the Oshkosh Steam Buggy, Oshkosh Steamer, or simply Oshkosh is one of two steam-powered automobiles which took part in a 200-mile endurance race in 1878 in the US state of Wisconsin.

In June 1878, the state of Wisconsin offered a prize of $10,000 to any citizen of the state who invented a steam-powered replacement for horses and other animals on the highway and farm.

Five residents of Oshkosh built the vehicle and made up the team: boiler maker M. G. "Mart" Battis, engineer John F. Morse, fire chief A. W. "Ans" Farrand, as well as Frank A. Shomer and Alexander Gallinger, who made their living selling wood for the wood-fuelled locomotives of the Chicago & North Western Railway. Their solid and massive steam-powered car weighed 4.5 tons (10,000 lb), was capable of reversing, and had a two-piston steam engine. The vehicle could cover approximately 10 miles (16 km) before fuel and water needed to be replenished, a supply of which was towed.

Despite being slower than its competitor, the even heavier Green Bay Steamer of E. P. Cowles of Wequiock, WI, the Oshkosh won the July 15 race because Cowles had lost too much time making repairs after an accident.

Afterwards, the government tried to get out of paying the prize money, arguing – with some justification – that the Oshkosh Steamer was neither "cheap" nor "practical." An agreement was reached out of court to pay half the prize money, a portion of which had to be paid on to Cowles.

== Notes and references ==
=== References ===
- Georgano, George Nicolas (1973). The Complete Encyclopedia of Motorcars: 1885 to the Present. New York: Dutton Press. ISBN 978-0-525-08351-1.
- Kimes, Beverly Rae; Clark, Henry Austin (1996). Standard Catalog of American Cars, 1805-1942. Iola, WI: Krause Publications. ISBN 978-0-87341-428-9.
- Kimes, Beverly Rae (2005). Pioneers, Engineers, and Scoundrels: The Dawn of the Automobile in America. Warrendale, PA: SAE International. ISBN 978-0-7680-1431-0.
- Donald, John S. (May 26, 1921). "Race of first steam buggies to Madison for prize is recounted". Capital Times. Madison, WI. OCLC 836786328.
- "Commissioners have been appointed by the Governor". The Expositor Independent. Sturgeon Bay. June 21, 1878. p. 4.
